Fort Sackville was a British fort in present-day Bedford, Nova Scotia. It was built during Father Le Loutre's War by British adjacent to present-day Scott Manor House, on a hill overlooking the Sackville River to help prevent French, Acadian and  Mi'kmaq attacks on Halifax.  The fort consisted of a blockhouse, a guard house, a barracks that housed 50 soldiers, and outbuildings, all encompassed by a palisade. Not far from the fort was a rifle range. The fort was named after George Germain, 1st Viscount Sackville.

Historical context 

Despite the British Conquest of Acadia in 1710, Nova Scotia remained primarily occupied by Catholic Acadians and Mi'kmaq. Father Le Loutre's War began when Edward Cornwallis arrived to establish Halifax with 13 transports on June 21, 1749. The British remained largely in Halifax, having attempted to establish a settlement east of Halifax near present-day Lawrencetown Beach they quickly abandoned the effort due to the threat of Mi'kmaq attacks. Four years after the founding of Halifax, Lunenburg was established. To guard against Mi'kmaq, Acadian and French attacks on the new Protestant settlements, British fortifications were erected in Halifax (Citadel Hill) (1749), Bedford (Fort Sackville) (1749), Dartmouth (1750), Lunenburg (1753) and Lawrencetown (1754).

Within 18 months of establishing Halifax, the British also took firm control of peninsula Nova Scotia by building fortifications in all the major Acadian communities: present-day Windsor (Fort Edward); Grand Pre (Fort Vieux Logis) and Chignecto (Fort Lawrence). (A British fort already existed at the other major Acadian centre of Annapolis Royal, Nova Scotia. Cobequid remained without a fort.)

Father Le Loutre's War 

On September 11, 1749,  Cornwallis sent New England Ranger John Gorham (military officer) to build a fort at the mouth of the Sackville River.  The fort was to protect Halifax from attack by the Wabanaki Confederacy, Acadians and French. Gorham's Rangers were primarily natives from Cape Cod, his own hometown.  He was sent with an armed vessel that stayed with him as Fort Sackville was built.  Five weeks later, on October 17, Cornwallis wrote, "The Posts of the Head of the Bay and Minas are made secure." Lt. Robert Pateshall of the 40th Regiment of Foot was also stationed at the Fort while Gorham used Fort Sackville as his base from which he "scoured the country" for Mi'kmaq scalps as per Cornwallis' bounty set October 1749.

Cornwallis ordered Gorham to Piziquid November 9 in an attempt to relieve the Mi'kmaq and Acadian Siege of Grand Pre. Gorham also oversaw the establishment of a road to Windsor, which was completed by December 17.  Gorham left again on January 3, 1750.  He was again ordered to Piziquid to build Fort Edward on March 29, 1750.  On his way he engaged in the surprise Battle at St. Croix with Mi'kmaq. Gorham had to seek relief from Captain William Clapham who arrived with rangers from Fort Sackville.

In early 1750, Captain Alexander Murray commanded at Fort Sackville (Nova Scotia) and then in September 1751 he was given command of Fort Edward (Nova Scotia).

In August 1750, Cornwallis replaced Gorham at Fort Sackville with Captain Francis Bartelo, who was killed the following month in the Battle at Chignecto. Gorham returned to Fort Sackville by March 1751. In the summer of 1751, Gorham built the first registered vessel in Halifax, a brig he named Osborn Galley at Gorham Point (present-day Halifax Dockyard).

In late September 1752, Mi'kmaq stripped and scalped a man they had caught outside the Palisade of Fort Sackville.

French and Indian War 

During the French and Indian War, in April 1757, a band of Acadian and Mi'kmaq partisans raided a warehouse near-by Fort Edward, killing thirteen British soldiers and, after taking what provisions they could carry, setting fire to the building.  A few days later, the same partisans also raided Fort Cumberland.  Because of the strength of the Acadian militia and Mi'kmaq militia, British officer John Knox wrote that "In the year 1757 we were said to be Masters of the province of Nova Scotia, or Acadia, which, however, was only an imaginary possession."  He continues to state that the situation in the province was so precarious for the British that the "troops and inhabitants" at Fort Edward, Fort Sackville and Lunenburg "could not be reputed in any other light than as prisoners."  On 28 September 1759, Mi'kmaw kill two labourers at Fort Sackville.

American Revolution 
During this war the Fort was an important way-station between Halifax and Fort Edward in Windsor and points beyond, including Fort Cumberland. As the war went on, the Royal Nova Scotia Volunteer Regiment became competent enough to serve as the garrison of the Fort, under day-to-day command of the senior captain, John Solomon.

Wars of the French Revolution 
During most of this period (1793–1802) Fort Sackville was garrisoned by detachments of the Royal Nova Scotia Regiment. On July 1, 1797, 34 officers and men are shown as being on duty.

Commanders 
 John Gorham (military officer)
 Robert Pateshall
 Alexander Murray
 Francis Bartelo
 John Solomon
Joseph Scott (merchant)

Legacy 
Fort Sackville Elementary  - Grades Primary and grade one, offers early French immersion
 Fort Sackville Road, Bedford, Nova Scotia

See also 
 Military history of Nova Scotia
Military history of the Mi'kmaq people
Military history of the Acadians
 History of the Halifax Regional Municipality

References

Sources
 The Evolution of the Halifax Fortress, 1749-1928,  Piers, Harry, Self, G.M., Blakeley, Phyllis R. (Phyllis Ruth)
 "Joseph Scott and the Scott Manor House: Research papers prepared for Halifax Regional Municipality" by Brian Cuthbertson and Gillis Architects, Part 5
 
 
 
 Tolson, Elsie Churchill.  The Captain, the Colonel and me. Fort Sackville Press. 1996.
 
Young, Richard. "Blockhouses in Canada, 1749-1841: a Comparative Report and Catalogue." Occasional Papers in Archaeology and History, Canadian Historic Site, 1980.

External links
Fort Sackville - Part 5, p. 48
 Scott Manor House
 
 Images of Fort Sackville during American Revolution

Military history of Acadia
Military history of Nova Scotia
Military history of New England
Military history of the Thirteen Colonies
Military forts in Nova Scotia
Acadian history
French and Indian War forts
Military forts in Acadia
1749 establishments in the British Empire